Jorge de Menezes (c. 1498 – 1537) was a Portuguese explorer. Due to a monsoon, he was forced to reside in Versya, posited by Pieter Anton Tiele as Waisai, between 1526 and 1527. Menezes called the region Ilhas dos Papuas, though the name of "Papua" was already known at the time. Yet he was still the first European to go ashore and thus credited with the European discovery of New Guinea.

Biography
As a nobleman, he was possibly the "D. Jorge de Meneses" present at the His Most Faithful Majesty's Council of Manuel I of Portugal in 1518 and 1519. In 1526, Menezes traveled to Brunei, detailing the city as being fortified by a brick wall and having a moderate number of notable buildings. His visit opened a new route to the Moluccas, becoming the favored course to Ternate. On 22 August 1526, he left Portuguese Malacca with 100 men to take his post but was sidetracked by a monsoon, leading to his discovery of New Guinea; he arrived in Ternate on 31 May 1527.

In 1528, he captured and plundered a lightly-defended Spanish fort commanded by Hernando de la Torre, during the competition between the empires over the Moluccas that ended with the Treaty of Zaragoza as well as a personal treaty with the Spanish and Menezes in 1529. He further involved the Portuguese in the affairs of the sultanate and held Boheyat and Dayal prisoner in Fort Kastela. Officials suspected of conspiring against him were executed. Beyond his political interferences, he committed atrocities against the population. Under orders of Dayal's mother, the fort was besieged. Subsequently, Menezes was arrested and sent to Old Goa, Portuguese India by his successor, Gonçalo Pereira. After his return to Portugal, he was banished to the Colony of Brazil. He captured indigenous people and enslaved them on his , provoking an attack that temporarily destroyed the captaincy and eradicated the colonists in 1537. Menezes died in combat during the assault.

See also
Portuguese Empire in the Indonesian Archipelago

References

Bibliography

Portuguese explorers
16th-century explorers
Explorers of Indonesia
Portuguese explorers of the Pacific
Year of birth unknown
1537 deaths
16th-century Portuguese people
Portuguese exiles
Maritime history of Portugal
Year of birth uncertain